is a passenger railway station located in the city of Koshigaya, Saitama, Japan, operated by the private railway operator Tōbu Railway.

Line
The station is served by the Tōbu Skytree Line (Tōbu Isesaki Line), and is 21.9 kilometers from the terminus of the line at Asakusa Station.

Station layout
The station has one elevated island platform with two tracks. The station building is located underneath the platforms. There are two additional tracks for express trains to bypass this station.

Platforms

Adjacent stations

History
Gamō Station opened on 20 December 1899. The station was relocated 1.2 kilometers south to its present location on 25 December 1908. A new station building was completed in 1998. From 17 March 2012, station numbering was introduced on all Tōbu lines, with Gamō Station becoming "TS-19".

Passenger statistics
In fiscal 2019, the station was used by an average of 17,476 passengers daily.

Surrounding area
 Gamō shopping street

See also
 List of railway stations in Japan

References

External links

 Tobu Station information 

Railway stations in Japan opened in 1899
Tobu Skytree Line
Stations of Tobu Railway
Railway stations in Saitama Prefecture
Koshigaya, Saitama